Not Thinking Straight may refer to:
 Not Thinking Straight (Matt Fishel album)
 "Not Thinking Straight", a song by Pint Shot Riot